Young Shakespeare is a live album and concert film from Canadian folk rock musician Neil Young recorded in 1971, and released on March 26, 2021. Recorded three days after Live at Massey Hall 1971, during the Journey Through the Past Solo Tour.

Track listing
All songs written by Neil Young.
"Tell Me Why"– 2:36
"Old Man"– 4:08
"The Needle and the Damage Done"– 3:47
"Ohio"– 3:02
"Dance Dance Dance"– 2:26
"Cowgirl in the Sand"– 4:21
"A Man Needs a Maid/ Heart of Gold"– 6:55
"Journey Through the Past"– 3:34
"Don't Let It Bring You Down"– 2:56
"Helpless"– 3:49
"Down by the River"– 4:12
"Sugar Mountain"– 8:40

Personnel
Neil Young– guitar, piano, vocals

Charts

References

External links

Sugar Mountain fan site on the performance

2021 live albums
Neil Young live albums